Gomaar is a village close to Shekosh district at Korahae zone in the Somali Region of Ethiopia.

Populated places in the Somali Region